More (also released as Jazz in the Movies) is an album by the Kenny Clarke/Francy Boland Big Band featuring performances recorded in Italy in 1968 and first released on producer Gigi Campi's own label. The album features big band arrangements of Italian film music.

Reception

The AllMusic review says "unless one is a devotee of Italian films, most of this music will be unfamiliar to jazz fans, although the perfunctory arrangements (nearly all under four minutes) don't leave room for a lot of solos... The music is good, but there are higher priority recordings by the Kenny Clarke-Francy Boland Big Band available".

Track listing
 "Seven Golden Men" (Armando Trovajoli) - 4:03
 "Je M'en Fous" (Riz Ortolani, Nino Oliviero, Marcello Ciorciolini) - 3:05
 "Your Smile" (Piero Piccioni) - 2:22
 "Questi Vent' Anni Miei" (Ennio Morricone, Franco Torti, Guido Castaldo) - 3:06
 "Passerella di Otto e Mezzo" (Nino Rota) - 2:44
 "Roma Nun Fa' la Stupida Stasera" (Trovajoli, Pietro Garinei, Sandro Giovannini) - 2:12
 "More" (Ortolani, Oliviero, Ciorciolini, Norman Newell) - 4:02
 "Canto d'Amore" (Carlo Rustichelli, Nino Nicotra) - 3:26
 "Voglio Bene al Mondo" (Oliviero, Torti, Castaldo) - 3:04
 "La Hora de la Verdad" (Piccioni) - 3:48
 "Saxology" (Mario Bertolazzi) - 2:48

Personnel 
Kenny Clarke - drums
Francy Boland - piano, arranger
Benny Bailey - trumpet, flugelhorn
Jimmy Deuchar, Shake Keane, Duško Gojković, Idrees Sulieman - trumpet
Nat Peck, Åke Persson, Eric van Lier - trombone
Derek Humble - alto saxophone 
Tony Coe, Johnny Griffin, Don Menza, Ronnie Scott,  - tenor saxophone
Sahib Shihab - baritone saxophone, flute
Jimmy Woode - bass
Fats Sadi - vibraphone, percussion 
Mario Bertolazzi, Ralph Ferraro - arranger

References 

1968 albums
Kenny Clarke/Francy Boland Big Band albums